Kalashi District is a district (bakhsh) in Javanrud County, Kermanshah Province, Iran. At the 2006 census, its population was 9,211, in 1,927 families.  The District has no cities. The District has two rural districts (dehestan): Kalashi Rural District and Sharvineh Rural District.

References 

Javanrud County
Districts of Kermanshah Province